Wongarra is a coastal locality in the Shire of Colac Otway, Victoria, Australia. In the 2016 census, Wongarra had a population of 37.

The Great Ocean Road runs along the coastline through Wongarra, with Sunnyside Road the only road running inland in the area. Much of the northern area of Wongarra is either state forest or lies within the Great Otway National Park. The locality contains scenic tourist destinations Cape Patton and the Carisbrook Falls.

A postal receiving office opened at Wongarra from 1 October 1912. Wongarra Post Office opened on 1 July 1927 and closed on 11 December 1971. A part-time school, shared with one at neighbouring Skenes Creek was open by 1905, at which time it was operating out of leased premises. In 1919, it was reported that the two part-time schools had an average attendance of 12. The Wongarra school was made full-time in 1926, but has long since closed.

The 3234 postcode, which includes Wongarra and Wye River, had the tenth-highest incomes of any in the state in 2010–11. It contains the four-star Whitecrest Resort, and the Points South holiday cottages, formerly run by ex-Tour de France cyclist Phil Anderson.

The well-known Otway Harvest truffle farm is located on Sunnyside Road, Wongarra. It was most recently sold in mid-2014 for over A$2,000,000. In 2012, it reportedly sold its truffles wholesale for a price of $2,500 per kilogram.

Surf Life Saving Australia rates the beaches along the Wongarra coastline as either highly or extremely dangerous for swimming, although they note that sections of them are popular for rock fishing. There are two surfing breaks in the area, known as "Boneyards" and "Juniors".

The former Carisbrook Mill site, located off Sunnyside Road, is listed on the Shire of Colac Otway Heritage Inventory.

References

Towns in Victoria (Australia)
Coastal towns in Victoria (Australia)
Otway Ranges